Pro Builder Media is a business-to-business media entity that includes a nationally distributed trade publication (print and digital magazine), website, social media channels, and events. It provides award-winning, timely, and topical content to more than 300,000 builders, contractors, and design professionals serving the U.S. housing and light-construction industries. It is the official media partner of the National Association of Home Builders (NAHB), based in Washington, D.C.

History and profile
Established in 1936, Pro Builder (formerly Professional Builder) magazine publishes to a primarily U.S.-based circulation six times per year, plus a “Pre-Show Planner” edition every December in collaboration with the National Association of Home Builders (NAHB) for the annual International Builders’ Show (IBS). 

The brand was founded by Cahners Publishing Company, in Des Plaines, Illinois, which moved to Newton, Massachusetts, in the 1990s. Following its acquisition by Reed Business Information, the magazine moved to Oak Brook, Illinois. In 2010, Reed Business Information closed the magazine, but it was purchased and relaunched soon after by Scranton Gillette Communications, in Arlington Heights, Illinois. It is currently published by SGC Horizon (a division of Scranton Gillette Communications), a diversified media, content, marketing, and events company based in Palatine, Illinois. 

Key Editorial and Audience Engagement Initiatives
 Pro Builder Show Village at IBS
 The New American Home (with NAHB)
 The Best in American Living Awards—BALA (with NAHB)
 The National Sales and Marketing Awards—The Nationals (with NAHB)
 Pro Builder Forty Under 40 (recognizing housing’s young leaders and innovators)
 Housing Giants (ranking the largest U.S.-based home builders by annual revenue)
 The National Housing Quality Awards (recognizing operational excellence among home building companies)
 Pro Builder Builder of the Year (recognizing a truly exemplary home builder)

Recent Awards

 Best Single Issue of a Magazine—2020 (Jesse H. Neal Awards)
 Magazine of the Year—2017-2020 (American Society of Business Press Editors)
 Best Magazine Redesign—2020 (Folio: Awards)

References

External links
Pro Builder website
Pro Builder LinkedIn page
Pro Builder YouTube channel
Pro Builder Instagram feed
Scranton Gillette Communications, Inc. - website

1936 establishments in Illinois
Business magazines published in the United States
Monthly magazines published in the United States
Engineering magazines
Magazines established in 1936
Magazines published in Chicago
Magazines published in Massachusetts
Professional and trade magazines
Magazines published in Illinois